{{DISPLAYTITLE:C19H23N3O3}}
The molecular formula C19H23N3O3 (molar mass: 341.40 g/mol, exact mass: 341.1739 u) may refer to:

 Naloxazone
 Coluracetam